Resistencia Civil (Civil Resistance) is a libertarian political movement in
Venezuela which advocates classical liberal principles i.e. limited government and free market. The movement is led by Domingo Alberto Rangel, who holds the rank of executive secretary of the Resistencia Civil. Guillermo Rodríguez is the chief economist of the movement.

References

Politics of Venezuela
Political organizations based in Venezuela
Libertarian organizations
Civic and political organizations of Venezuela